The El Morro Theater in Gallup, New Mexico was built in 1928.  It was listed on the National Register of Historic Places in 1988.

It was deemed notable as "the only example of Spanish Colonial Revival architecture in Gallup." It was designed by Carl Boller, of the Boller Brothers architectural firm.  It is a two-story building with a barrel vault roof.

References

		
Theatres in New Mexico		
National Register of Historic Places in McKinley County, New Mexico
Mission Revival architecture in New Mexico
Buildings and structures completed in 1928
1928 establishments in New Mexico